Younes Taha El Idrissi (born 27 November 2002) is a Moroccan footballer who plays for PEC Zwolle.

Career
Taha joined PEC Zwolle in the summer of 2022 from FC Volendam having never started a senior game for Volendam. He signed for PEC Zwolle on a two year contract with an option for a third year.

Taha made his league debut in the Eerste Divisie starting on 7 August 2022 in a  2-1 win against De Graafschap at the MAC³PARK Stadion.

On 12 September 2022 Taha scored his first professional goal away against Jong AZ. In October 2022 Taha’s contract with PEC Zwolle was improved and extended for an extra year.

References

2002 births
Living people
PEC Zwolle players
Eerste Divisie players
Dutch footballers
Association football midfielders
FC Volendam players